Axinidris kakamegensis is a species of ant in the genus Axinidris. Described by Shattuck in 1991, the species is endemic to Kenya, where it was only in an unknown area of the Kakamega Forest.

References

Axinidris
Hymenoptera of Africa
Insects described in 1991